Blanchester High School is a public high school in Blanchester, Ohio.  It is the only high school in the Blanchester Local Schools district.  Its athletic program, known as the Wildcats, was a charter member of the Fort Ancient Valley Conference from 1964 until 1992. The school is now part of the Southern Buckeye Athletic/Academic Conference National Division. The building currently in use was open in 2002.

References

External links
 District website

High schools in Clinton County, Ohio
Public high schools in Ohio